Arene riisei is a species of small sea snail, a marine gastropod mollusk in the family Areneidae.

Description

The shell can grow to be 4 mm to 8 mm in length.

Distribution
Arene riisei can be found from Mexico to East Brazil.

References

Areneidae
Gastropods described in 1943